Friedrich Christian Hermann Uber (22 April 1781 – 2 March 1822) was a German composer, who also served as the cantor of the Kreuzkirche in Dresden.

Born in Breslau (modern Wrocław), he was the son of lawyer and music-lover Christian Benjamin (born Hermann) Uber; his brother Alexander was a noted cello virtuoso.  He studied law in Halle (Saale),  before receiving a musical education from Daniel Gottlob Türk.  He then received placement as a chamber musician at the court of Prince Louis Ferdinand; beginning in 1807 he served as a first violinist in the orchestra in Braunschweig.  In 1808, on the orders of Jérôme Bonaparte, he was appointed Kapellmeister of the opera in Kassel.

In 1814 he was appointed by king Jérôme Bonaparte as Opernkapellmeister to Kassel. Beginning in the same year he also served as  Kapellmeister of the Staatstheater Mainz, and in 1816 he became music director of a group of theaters in Dresden. From 1818 until his death he served as music director of the Kreuzkirche; at the same time he worked as its cantor.

Uber composed French and German operas, intermezzi, cantatas, a Passion, and a violin concerto.  Stylistically, he was a Romantic.  He died in Dresden in 1822.

1781 births
1822 deaths
Musicians from Wrocław
German violinists
German male violinists
German opera composers
Male opera composers
German male classical composers
19th-century German musicians
19th-century German male musicians